"Mickey's 50" is a 1978 television special honouring the 50-year anniversary of the debut of Walt Disney's animated character Mickey Mouse. The show aired on NBC on November 19, 1978, one day after Mickey's official birthday, as a special 90-minute edition of The Wonderful World of Disney.

Summary
This show covers the history and career of Mickey Mouse from his humble beginnings in the first Disney sound cartoon Steamboat Willie to his popularity in the 1930s, his presence on television through The Mickey Mouse Club, and his role as the official host of Disneyland and Walt Disney World. Also covered are his relationships with his co-stars, including his girlfriend Minnie Mouse and his nemesis Peg-Leg Pete, and how his success helped build Walt Disney Productions into the entertainment empire it is today.

Throughout the show, a variety of special guest stars and celebrities appear to introduce various anecdotes about Mickey's career and to wish him a happy birthday. Also shown is a three-part live-action/stop-motion short film by Mike Jittlov revolving around a man (played by Jittlov himself) who is tormented by his vast collection of Mickey merchandise. The show closes with a performance of the original song "(The Whole World Wants to Wish You) Happy Birthday Mickey Mouse".

List of special guests

Jack Albertson
Edward Asner
Anne Bancroft
Edgar Bergen
Ken Berry
Jacqueline Bisset
Mel Brooks
Carol Burnett
Levar Burton
Red Buttons
Ruth Buzzi
Dyan Cannon
Cantinflas
Karen and Richard Carpenter
Johnny Carson
Charo
Chewbacca
Hans Conried
Dick Clark
Susan Clark
Bette Davis
Phyllis Diller
Dale Evans
Sally Field
Gerald Ford
Jodie Foster
Kermit the Frog
Annette Funicello
Eva Gabor
Steve Garvey
Elliott Gould
Rev. Billy Graham
Goldie Hawn
Helen Hayes
Sterling Holloway
Bob Hope
Bruce Jenner
Elton John
Dean Jones
Shirley Jones
Gene Kelly
Christopher Lee
R2-D2
Rich Little
Roger Miller
Anne Murray
Joe Namath
Willie Nelson
Gary Owens
Gregory Peck
Peter Sellers
Doc Severinsen
O. J. Simpson
Helen Reddy
Burt Reynolds
Adam Rich
Kenny Rogers
Roy Rogers
Mickey Rooney
Ronnie Schell
Shields and Yarnell
Peter Strauss
James Stewart
Dick Van Patten
Jan-Michael Vincent
Barbara Walters
Raquel Welch
Lawrence Welk
Henry Winkler
Jonathan Winters
Jo Anne Worley

See also 
Mickey's 60th Birthday, a 1988 special honoring Mickey Mouse's 60th birthday.
Mickey's 90th Spectacular, a 2018 special honoring Mickey Mouse's 90th birthday.

References

External links 

1978 American television episodes
Mickey Mouse
Walt Disney anthology television series episodes
Disney television specials
1978 in American television
1978 television specials
1970s American television specials